Santa Apollonia may refer to:

 Saint Apollonia
 Santa Apollonia (Pisa), a church in Pisa, Italy
 Réunion island, known as Santa Apollonia when it was ruled by the Portuguese